Ivan Stoitsov (Иван Стоицов, born  in Plovdiv) is a Bulgarian male weightlifter, competing in the 77 kg category and representing Bulgaria at international competitions. He participated at the 2004 Summer Olympics in the 77 kg event. He competed at world championships, most recently at the 2007 World Weightlifting Championships.

Stoitsov tested positive for a steroid in 2008, and therefore Bulgaria's weightlifting federation withdrew its team from the 2008 Summer Olympics. Eight members of the men's team and three women tested positive during out-of-competition tests conducted on June 8 and June 9. Apart from Tsagaev the athletes who tested positive were Ivailo Filev, Demir Demirev, Mehmed Fikretov, Alan Tsagaev, Ivan Markov, Georgi Markov, Velichko Cholakov, Milka Maneva, Donka Mincheva and Gergana Kirilova.

Major results

References

External links
 

1985 births
Living people
Bulgarian male weightlifters
Weightlifters at the 2004 Summer Olympics
Olympic weightlifters of Bulgaria
Sportspeople from Plovdiv
Doping cases in weightlifting
World Weightlifting Championships medalists
20th-century Bulgarian people
21st-century Bulgarian people